El Hombre is the debut album by jazz guitarist Pat Martino. It was recorded in 1967 and released by Prestige Records

Reception

Allmusic gave the album 4½ stars, stating, "Guitarist Pat Martino's debut as a leader finds the 22-year-old showing off his roots in soul-jazz organ groups while looking ahead at the same time...Martino primarily plays a straight-ahead set but already displays a fairly distinctive sound".

The authors of the Penguin Guide to Jazz Recordings stated that, although El Hombre "depend[s] on blues-base formulas" and is "typical of the genre... Martino's maturing style... is good enough to transcend the settings."

Writing for PopMatters, Will Layman commented: "El Hombre is an organ-drenched speedfest that shows off this Philly kid's ability to play soulfully, spinning out seemingly endless solos shot through with blue notes, flatted fifths, and thirty-second runs. It was Martino's calling card, and this was his party. And it is, appropriately, a good time... El Hombre deserves to be heard by new fans as well as old ones. Many a young guitarist today will be stunned and jealous, I'm sure, of how fresh this... music still sounds."

In an article for All About Jazz, Ian Patterson wrote: "There are any number of truly great Martino solos throughout this swinging straight-ahead session... An auspicious debut that announced the arrival of a great talent and a distinctive voice."

Track listing

Personnel
 Pat Martino – guitar
 Danny Turner – flute
 Trudy Pitts – Hammond organ
 Mitch Fine – drums
 Vance Anderson – bongos
 Abdu Johnson – congas

Production
 Cal Lampley – producer
 Rudy Van Gelder – engineer

References 

Pat Martino albums
1967 debut albums
Prestige Records albums
Albums produced by Cal Lampley
Albums recorded at Van Gelder Studio